The Pennsylvania Auditor General election of 2016 was held on November 8, 2016. The primary election was held on April 26, 2016.

Democratic primary

Candidates
Eugene DePasquale, incumbent

Results

Republican primary

Candidates
John Brown, former mayor of Bangor and Northampton County executive

Results

General election

References

2016 Pennsylvania elections
Pennsylvania Auditor General elections
November 2016 events in the United States
Pennsylvania